Mine Pyin is a town located in Shan, Myanmar.  It is 1528 feet above sea level.
There is a local river named Num Pyin ("reverse river") because it flows from south to north.  Shan ethnic groups in the area are mainly Lahu, Wa, and Ar Khar.  There is one basic education high school in the town, and the majority of the population is Buddhist.

Populated places in Shan State